Melonycteris (dark blossom bat) is a genus of megabat in the family Pteropodidae. Members are found in the Solomon Islands or in the case of the black-bellied fruit bat, in Papua New Guinea.

It contains the following species:

 Fardoulis's blossom bat, Melonycteris fardoulisi
 Black-bellied fruit bat, Melonycteris melanops
 Woodford's fruit bat, Melonycteris woodfordi

References

 
Bat genera
Taxa named by George Edward Dobson
Taxonomy articles created by Polbot